Lorraine Island is an island off the South coast of Western Australia in the Recherche Archipelago.

The island supports a population of 2000-3000 pairs white-faced storm-petrel.

References

External links
Beaches of the Western Australian Coast - Eucla to Roebuck Bay

Recherche Archipelago